André Olivier (born 29 December 1989) is a South African middle distance runner.

He won a bronze medal in the 800m race at the 2014 Commonwealth Games in Glasgow, Scotland, behind winner Nigel Amos of Botswana and David Rudisha (Olympic champion and world record holder) of Kenya.

Olivier won a bronze medal at the 2008 World Junior Championships in Athletics in Bydgoszcz, Poland.

Competition record

References

External links

1989 births
Living people
Sportspeople from Pietermaritzburg
South African male middle-distance runners
Athletes (track and field) at the 2012 Summer Olympics
Olympic athletes of South Africa
Commonwealth Games bronze medallists for South Africa
Athletes (track and field) at the 2014 Commonwealth Games
Commonwealth Games medallists in athletics
Universiade medalists in athletics (track and field)
Universiade bronze medalists for South Africa
South African Athletics Championships winners
Medalists at the 2011 Summer Universiade
Medallists at the 2014 Commonwealth Games